The Mevlana Mosque is a mosque in northwestern Rotterdam, Netherlands which serves mainly Turkish-Dutch Muslims. The mosque, named after Rumi, was built in 2001 and benefits from two minarets. The mosque was voted as Rotterdam's most attractive building in 2006.

See also 
 List of mosques in the Netherlands

References

Bibliography 
 
 .
 .

External links 
 Official website 

Buildings and structures in Rotterdam
Moorish Revival architecture
Mosques completed in 2001
Mosques in the Netherlands
Mosque buildings with domes
Vernacular architecture
21st-century religious buildings and structures in the Netherlands